La Tour-en-Maurienne is a commune in the Savoie department in the Auvergne-Rhône-Alpes region in south-eastern France. It was established on 1 January 2019 by merger of the former communes of Hermillon (the seat), Le Châtel and Pontamafrey-Montpascal.

See also
Communes of the Savoie department

References

Communes of Savoie